Pass Manchac Light was a historic lighthouse in Tangipahoa Parish, Louisiana, which was originally established in 1838, to mark the north side of the entrance to Pass Manchac, the channel between Lake Pontchartrain and Lake Maurepas. The fourth and last tower on this particular site was constructed in 1857 and was in service for 130 years.  The first three had been built in 1838, 1842, and 1846, in each case requiring replacement due to poor construction and/or encroaching lake waters.

History
The 1857 lighthouse, a brick cylinder with attached house, was damaged in the Civil War and during tropical storms in 1888, 1890, 1915, 1926, and 1931. The station was automated in 1941, and the keeper's house was removed in 1952, by which time the light was on an island instead of a peninsula.

Pass Manchac Light was added to the National Register of Historic Places in 1986. The light was functionally replaced in 1987 by the U.S. Coast Guard, which established a skeleton tower on the south side of the pass entrance.

On August 28, 2012, Louisiana was struck by Hurricane Isaac, destroying the lighthouse. It was removed from the National Register in January 2019.

However, since February 2008 its lantern room – which was removed from the tower in 2002 for restoration – has been located at the Lake Pontchartrain Basin Maritime Museum, in Madisonville, Louisiana.

Gallery

See also
Manchac, Louisiana
National Register of Historic Places listings in Tangipahoa Parish, Louisiana

References

External links

Pass Manchac at Lighthouse Friends detailed history
1996 video of the Pass Manchac Light
Website of Lake Pontchartrain Basin Maritime Museum in Madisonville, Louisiana

Lighthouses completed in 1838
Lighthouses completed in 1842
Lighthouses completed in 1846
Lighthouses completed in 1857
Buildings and structures in Tangipahoa Parish, Louisiana
Lighthouses on the National Register of Historic Places in Louisiana
Buildings and structures demolished in 2012
Tourist attractions in Tangipahoa Parish, Louisiana
Transportation in Tangipahoa Parish, Louisiana
1838 establishments in Louisiana